The Radioplane OQ-6 was a target drone developed by the Radioplane Company under the designation RP-14 and evaluated by the United States Army Air Forces for service use. A small number were procured, but major production contracts were cancelled by the end of World War II.

Design and development
The Radioplane RP-14 was a small aircraft of conventional design, with a strut-braced monoplane wing and conventional empennage; power was from a Righter O-45 four-cylinder horizontally-opposed piston engine. An improved version, the RP-15, replaced the O-45 with a McCulloch O-90. The airframe was improved over the company's preceding OQ-3, with improved streamlining.

Operational history
The RP-14 first flew in November 1944; designated OQ-6 by the U.S. Army Air Forces (USAAF), evaluation led to the development of the improved RP-15, designated OQ-6A, and orders for production of the aircraft in quantity were placed. These orders were cancelled due to the end of World War II; however, some OQ-6s, redesignated XOQ-6A, were still in service with the United States Air Force (USAF) in 1948.

Variants and operators
RP-14
Initial version powered by Righter O-45
OQ-6
USAAF designation of RP-14.
RP-15
Improved version of RP-14 with  McCulloch O-90; top speed .
OQ-6A
USAAF designation of RP-15.
XOQ-6A
USAF redesignation of surviving OQ-6s and OQ-6As.

Specifications (OQ-6)

See also

References
Citations

Bibliography

 
 

OQ-006
1940s United States special-purpose aircraft
Single-engined tractor aircraft
Mid-wing aircraft
Target drones
Aircraft first flown in 1944